Kwang is an East Chadic language of Chad.

References

Languages of Chad
East Chadic languages